The Jack Wood House is a historic house on Judson Avenue in Judsonia, Arkansas.  It is an L-shaped wooden structure, clad in weatherboard siding, and presently exhibiting Craftsman styling, the result of a major restyling in c. 1924.  The oldest portion of the house was built about 1890, and is a rare local example of box frame construction, with vertical planking as the main means of support, joined to the sills and rafters by square-cut nails.  A more conventionally framed ell and the front porch were added about 1907.

The house was listed on the National Register of Historic Places in 1989.

See also
National Register of Historic Places listings in White County, Arkansas

References

Houses on the National Register of Historic Places in Arkansas
Houses completed in 1890
Houses in White County, Arkansas
National Register of Historic Places in White County, Arkansas
1890 establishments in Arkansas